Jugaari is a 2010 Kannada film directed by S. D. Arvind. The music of the film was composed by Arjun Janya.The film was produced by Ramesh G.R.

Cast 
 Avinash Diwakar as Shankara 
 Harshika Poonacha
 Avinash
 Sharath Lohitashwa
 B. Suresha
 Girija Lokesh

Reception

Critical response 

BS Srivani from Deccan Herald wrote "Harshika tries mightily to chew a role that is big for her and does a creditable job. The rest - Shivaji Jadhav, Avinash and several other actors - have all done a splendid job. “Jugaari” is intelligent cinema, with little “mass” appeal". A critic from The New Indian Express wrote "Aravind’s USP is the narration of the story during the post-intermission session. The climax of this film is not only hilarious but also interesting and Suresh’s dialogues laced with North Karnataka diction give the audience a hearty laugh. Another scene, where the hero translocates a so-called social worker to a garbage dumping yard, provides comic relief".

References 

2010 films
Films scored by Arjun Janya
2010s Kannada-language films